Magane Mahisha is a 2022 Indian Tulu language film written and directed by Veerendra Shetty Kavoor. The cast of the movie includes Devadas Kapikad, Jyothi Rai, Naveen D Padil, Arvind Bolar and Bhojaraj Vamnjoor in lead roles. Magane Mahisha has been produced by Veerendra Shetty Kavoor under the banner of Veeru Talkies. The movie was released on 29 April 2022. The music of the film is released worldwide  by Movietone Digital Entertainment Pvt Ltd under its flagship music label “OnClick Music” in Tulu & Kannada language both.

Plot 
The film is about the three Convicted thieves, Shambhu, Shankara and Razak, turn over a new leaf after being released from jail and seek to become good Samartians. An unforeseen incident puts them in a precarious life or death situation between dangerous gangsters and the police.

Cast 
Devdas Kapikad
Naveen D Padil
Bhojaraj Vamanjoor
Arvind Bolar
Jyothi Rai
Shivadhwaj 
Shobharaj Pahoor

Soundtrack 
The soundtracks of the film were composed by Mano Murthy and the promotional song 'Magane Magane' was composed by Loy Valentine Saldanha.

References 

2022 films
Tulu-language films
Indian crime comedy films